Dilber's Eight Days is a 2008 Turkish drama film, written and directed by Cemal Şan, starring Nesrin Cevadzade as a young village woman who leaves with a stranger after being spurned by her lover. It is the second part of a trilogy of films which includes Zeynep's Eight Days (2007) and Ali's Eight Days (2009).

Plot
Dilber lives with her family in a very poor eastern village. Her only dream is to marry her childhood lover, Ali. But when she finds out that it will not happen, she goes crazy and locks herself in her family's barn. Then she makes everybody know that she will marry the first guy who proposes and will not leave the barn until that happens. One day, a limping man comes to the village. He is alone and has heard that there is a girl in that village who is ready to marry him.

Production
The film was shot on location in Mardin, Turkey.

References

External links
 

2000s Turkish-language films
2008 drama films
2008 films
Films set in Turkey
Turkish drama films